Steak and kidney pudding is a traditional British main course in which beef steak and beef, veal, pork or lamb kidney are enclosed in suet pastry and slow-steamed on a stovetop.

History and ingredients
Steak puddings (without kidney) were part of British cuisine by the 18th century. Hannah Glasse (1751) gives a recipe for a suet pudding with beef-steak (or mutton). Nearly a century later Eliza Acton (1846) specifies rump steak for her "Small beef-steak pudding" made with suet pastry, but, like her predecessor, does not include kidney.

An early mention of steak and kidney pudding appears in Bell's New Weekly Messenger on 11 August 1839 when the writer says:

According to the cookery writer Jane Grigson, the first published recipe to include kidney with the steak in a suet pudding was in 1859 in Mrs Beeton's Household Management. Beeton had been sent the recipe by a correspondent in Sussex in south-east England, and Grigson speculates that it was until then a regional dish, unfamiliar to cooks in other parts of Britain. 

Beeton suggested that the dish could be "very much enriched" by the addition of mushrooms or oysters. In those days oysters were the cheaper of the two: mushroom cultivation was still in its infancy in Europe and oysters were still commonplace. In the following century Dorothy Hartley (1954) recommended the use of black-gilled mushrooms rather than oysters, because the long cooking is "apt to make [oysters] go hard".

Neither Beeton nor Hartley specified the type of animal from which the kidneys were to be used in a steak and kidney recipe. Grigson (1974) calls for either veal or beef kidney, as does Marcus Wareing. Other cooks of modern times have variously specified lamb or sheep kidney (Marguerite Patten, Nigella Lawson and John Torode), beef kidney (Mary Berry, Delia Smith and Hugh Fearnley-Whittingstall), veal kidney (Gordon Ramsay), either pork or lamb (Jamie Oliver), and either beef, lamb or veal kidneys (Gary Rhodes).

Cooking
The traditional method, given in Beeton's recipe, calls for the meat to be put raw into a pastry-lined pudding basin, sealed with a pastry lid, covered with a cloth and steamed in a pan of simmering water for several hours. In Grigson's view "one gets a better, less sodden crust if the filling is cooked first", and, after Hartley's, all the recipes from recent years mentioned above follow suit. In a 2012 article "How to cook the perfect steak and kidney pudding", Felicity Cloake identified one relatively modern recipe, by Constance Spry, that calls for the meat to go in raw, but found that it "comes out gloopy with flour, and tough as a Victorian boarding school". In addition to the steak and kidney, the filling typically contains carrots and onions, and is pre-cooked in one or more of beef stock, red wine and stout.

Nicknames
According to the Oxford Companion to Food, cockneys call steak and kidney pudding "Kate and Sydney Pud". In the slang of the British Armed Forces and some parts of North West England, the puddings are called "babbies' heads".

Notes, references and sources

Notes

References

Sources

See also

 List of beef dishes
 List of steak dishes
 List of steamed foods
 Steak and kidney pie
 Suet pudding

External links
   Steak and kidney pudding recipe at bbc.co.uk

English beef dishes
British puddings
English cuisine
Savory puddings
Steamed foods
Food combinations